The Campeonato Argentino de Rugby 1964 was won by the selection of Buenos Aires that beat in the final the selection of Rosario

That year in Argentina rugby union

National 
 The Buenos Aires Champsionship was won by C.A.S.I.
 The Cordoba Province Championship was won by Universitario Cordoba
 The North-East Championship was won by Cardenales
 The Buenos Aires Cricket and Rugby Club, the oldest Argentine club arrive to their 100 years

International
 In the 1964 Argentine national team won the South American Championship, played in São Paulo-
 Was announced the 1965 Argentina rugby union tour of Rhodesia and South Africa, with the begin of training at the end of 1964, for the first experience of Argentine rugby outside of South America.

Preliminary

Semifinals 

 Sur: A. Torres, A. Vila, J. Angelo, O. Fasano, E. Diez, H. De Caso, R. Urriza (cap.), J. Suárez, J. De la Cruz, R. Sánchez, R. Smith, .1. Tuminello, F. Pacho, N. Boselli, J. Dover
 Rosario: J. Seaton, E. España, E. Ferraza, J. Benzi, R. Avalos, J. Scialabra, O. Aletta, J. Imhoff, A. Rinaldi, M. Paván (cap.), A. Colla, M. Bouza, H. Ferraro, J. Benvenuto, R. Esmendi. 

 Cuyo: J. Muñoz, O. Villanueva, Ay Meli, J. Walker, E. Casale, E. Valejos, E. Naveyra, L. Chaluleu (cap.), J. Aldao, M. Brandi, L. Novillo, J. Nasazzi, O. Luján Williams, F. Segovia, R. Farielo.
 Buenos Aires: M. Dumas, H. Goti, J. O. Queirolo, M. Molina Berro, E. Neri, J. H. Dartiguelonge, A. Etchegaray, R. Foster, H. Silva, M. Puigdevall, A. Otaño, R. L. M. García Yañez, N. González del Solar, G. Mc Cormick, A. Silveira.

Final 

Rosario: J. Seaton, E. España, J. Benzi, E. Ferraza, R. Abalos, A. Fasce, O. Aletta, M. Paván (cap.), A. Rinaldi, José Imhoff, A. Colla, H. Ferraro, R. Esmendi, J. Benvenuto, A. Paván.
   Buenos Aires: M. Dumas, H. Goti, J. C. Queirolo, M. Molina, E. Neri, M. Beccar Varela, A. Etchegaray, H. Silva, R. Foster, G. Montes de Oca, L. Varela, B. Otaño (cap.), G. McCormick, N. González del Solar, I. García Yáñez.

External links 
Memorias de la UAR 1964
Rugby Archive

Campeonato Argentino de Rugby
Argentina
rugby